1257 Móra, provisional designation , is an asteroid from the inner regions of the asteroid belt, approximately 15 kilometers in diameter. It was discovered on 8 August 1932, by German astronomer Karl Reinmuth at Heidelberg Observatory in southwest Germany. The asteroid was named after Hungarian astronomer .

Orbit and classification 

Móra orbits the Sun in the inner main-belt at a distance of 2.3–2.7 AU once every 3 years and 11 months (1,434 days). Its orbit has an eccentricity of 0.08 and an inclination of 4° with respect to the ecliptic.

Physical characteristics

Rotation period 

American astronomer Richard Binzel and French amateur astronomer René Roy obtained three rotational light curves of Móra from photometric observation taken in 1983 and 2009/11, respectively. Light curve analysis gave a well-defined rotation period between 2.28 and 2.30 hours with a change in brightness of 0.23 to 0.43 magnitude. The short period is just above the threshold of 2.2 hours for the so-called fast rotators.

Diameter, albedo and spectral type 

According to the space-based surveys carried out by the Japanese Akari satellite and NASA's Wide-field Infrared Survey Explorer with its subsequent NEOWISE mission, Móra measures between 14.72 and 21.47 kilometers in diameter and its surface has an albedo between 0.051 and 0.10.

The Collaborative Asteroid Lightcurve Link assumes a standard albedo for stony S-type asteroids of 0.20 and derives a shorter diameter of 10.79 kilometers, while Richard Binzel classified it as a carbonaceous C-type asteroid during his photometric observations in the 1980s.

Naming 

This minor planet was named in honour of Hungarian astronomer Károly Móra (1899–1938). The official naming citation was  mentioned in The Names of the Minor Planets by Paul Herget in 1955. As a curiosity, astronomer Paul Wild reshuffled the letters and numbers of the designation "1257 Mora" to construct a name for his discovery 2517 Orma in 1968 ( also means "trace, track" in Italian).

References

External links 
 Asteroid Lightcurve Database (LCDB), query form (info )
 Dictionary of Minor Planet Names, Google books
 Asteroids and comets rotation curves, CdR – Observatoire de Genève, Raoul Behrend
 Discovery Circumstances: Numbered Minor Planets (1)-(5000)  – Minor Planet Center
 
 

 

001257
Discoveries by Karl Wilhelm Reinmuth
Named minor planets
19320808